Rocket is a fictional character in the Marvel Cinematic Universe (MCU) media franchise voiced by Bradley Cooper and based on the Marvel Comics character of the same name. Rocket was based on movements from Sean Gunn and an actual raccoon named Oreo. Rocket is a hot-tempered mercenary and weapons expert who, along with his companion Groot, joins the Guardians of the Galaxy. They then come across several battles, such as against Ronan the Accuser and Ego. Later, they meet Thor, who takes Rocket and Groot to Earth. Following the Blip, Rocket remains on Earth as a member of the Avengers. Years later, Rocket and the Avengers quantum time travel to alternate universes to find the Infinity Stones. Following their success, Rocket joins the battle against an alternate Thanos, and rejoins the Guardians after their victory; departing for space. Later, he and the Guardians make their base on Knowhere.

Rocket made his first appearance in Guardians of the Galaxy (2014), and has become a central MCU character, appearing in six films as of 2022, and in an episode of the I Am Groot series of animated shorts on Disney+, the TV special The Guardians of the Galaxy Holiday Special (2022), as well as in the upcoming film Guardians of the Galaxy Vol. 3 (2023).

Concept and creation

The comic book character was created by Bill Mantlo and Keith Giffen, and inspired by the Beatles song "Rocky Raccoon". Rocket Raccoon first appeared in Marvel Preview #7 (Summer 1976), in the back-up feature "The Sword in the Star", under the name "Rocky". He would next appear in The Incredible Hulk #271 (May 1982), where it is learned that "Rocky" is short for "Rocket". In 1985, he received his own four-issue limited series and in an afterword to the first issue, Mantlo himself asserted that this was the same character seen in Preview, penciled by Mike Mignola and inked by Al Gordon with Al Milgrom. Rocket appeared in Quasar #15 in 1990 and later appeared in three issues of Sensational She-Hulk in 1992 (#44–46). The character only appeared in a total of ten comic books in his first thirty years of existence. Besides a brief appearance in a 2006 issue of Exiles, Rocket Raccoon was next seen in 2007's Annihilation: Conquest and Annihilation: Conquest - Star-Lord limited series, and their spin-off series, a new volume of Guardians of the Galaxy. He remained a regular member of the series cast until it was canceled with issue #25 in 2010.

Marvel Studios President Kevin Feige first mentioned Guardians of the Galaxy as a potential film at the 2010 San Diego Comic-Con International, stating, "There are some obscure titles, too, like Guardians of the Galaxy. I think they've been revamped recently in a fun way in the [comic] book." Feige reiterated that sentiment in a September 2011 issue of Entertainment Weekly, saying, "There's an opportunity to do a big space epic, which Thor sort of hints at, in the cosmic side" of the Marvel Cinematic Universe. Feige added, should the film be made, it would feature an ensemble of characters, similar to X-Men and The Avengers. Feige announced that the film was in active development at the 2012 San Diego Comic-Con International during the Marvel Studios panel, with an intended release date of August 1, 2014. He said the film's titular team would consist of the characters Star-Lord, Drax the Destroyer, Gamora, Groot, and Rocket. In August 2013, Marvel announced that Bradley Cooper would voice Rocket in Guardians of the Galaxy.

Characterization
In Guardians of the Galaxy, Rocket was characterized as a genetically engineered raccoon-based bounty hunter, mercenary, and master of weapons and battle tactics. Gunn worked with live raccoons to get the correct feel for the character, and to make sure it was "not a cartoon character", saying, "It's not Bugs Bunny in the middle of the Avengers, it's a real, little, somewhat mangled beast that's alone. There's no one else in the universe quite like him, he's been created by these guys to be a mean-ass fighting machine". Gunn also based the character on himself. Describing Rocket in relation to the rest of the Guardians, Cooper said, "I think Rocket is dynamic. He's the sort of Joe Pesci in Goodfellas guy."

Cooper voiced Rocket, while Sean Gunn (James' younger brother) stood in for the character during filming. James Gunn said that for the role of Rocket, some physical movements from Cooper, including facial expressions and hand movements, were recorded as potential references for the animators, though much of Sean Gunn's acting is used throughout the film. Sean noted they "kind of stumbled" into the process of him performing on set since they "weren't sure how we were going to create that character". The same process continued to be used for all subsequent appearances of Rocket. Before Cooper was cast, James Gunn said that it was a challenge finding a voice for Rocket, that he was looking for someone who could balance "the fast-talking speech patterns that Rocket has, but also can be funny, because he is really funny. But also has the heart that Rocket has. Because there are actually some pretty dramatic scenes with Rocket." In addition to Cooper's voice and Sean Gunn's movements, the appearance of Rocket was based on an actual raccoon named Oreo. James Gunn said of the process, "We needed a raccoon to study how he looked and his behavior, so that our on-screen raccoon, which is generated through CGI will be realistic. Our Rocket is based on a combination of our voice actor, Bradley Cooper, our on-set actor, my brother Sean Gunn, the movements and behavior and look of Oreo [the raccoon], as well as my own animation". Gunn brought Oreo to the red carpet premiere of the film.

In Guardians of the Galaxy Vol. 2, Sean Gunn once again served as the stand-in for the character during filming, with Cooper's performance also referenced. Sean Gunn said that "Rocket has the same sort of crisis of faith [that he had in the first film] about whether or not he belongs in this family", with James Gunn adding, "this is really about Rocket coming to terms with accepting his place within a group of people, which probably seemed like a good idea" when they were heroes together at the end of the first film, but now "he's just not very comfortable with the idea". Feige stated that the relationship between Rocket and Groot has changed, saying, "Groot was Rocket's protector in the first movie, [and now] Rocket is Groot's protector."

Oreo died in 2019, at the age of ten.

Fictional character biography

Origins

Rocket's origins are unclear, but he is unique; according to the Nova Corps, he was "the result of illegal genetic and cybernetic experiments on a lower life form". His record with the Nova Corps indicates a lengthy history of theft, arson, and escape from incarceration. At some point in his travels, Rocket becomes friends and partners with Groot, a sentient anthropomorphic tree.

Guardian of the Galaxy

In 2014, Rocket and Groot travel to Xandar, where they try to capture Peter Quill for a bounty, interfering in a fight between Quill and Gamora over possession of the Power Stone that Quill had acquired. All four are captured by the Nova Corps and sent to the space prison, the Kyln. Rocket devises a plan to escape from the Kyln, and they escape along with Drax the Destroyer, another inmate. The five, deeming themselves as the Guardians of the Galaxy, then travel to Knowhere to sell the Power Stone, where Rocket and Drax have a heated argument. After Drax drunkenly calls Ronan the Accuser to confront him, Ronan acquires the Power Stone. Rocket wanted to flee, but is convinced by Groot and by Drax's apology to help save Xandar from Ronan's attack. As other members of the team battle Ronan aboard his ship, the Dark Aster, Rocket crashes a Ravager ship through the Dark Aster, which crash-lands on Xandar. Groot sacrifices himself to shield Rocket and the team, and the remaining Guardians are able to gain control of the Power Stone and destroy Ronan. Rocket plants a sapling cut from Groot in a pot, which grows into a baby of his species, whom Rocket adopts, also naming Groot in his biological father's honour.

Facing Ego

Two months later, Rocket and the Guardians are hired by the Sovereign to fight off an alien attacking their valuable batteries, in exchange for Nebula. Annoyed by the arrogance of the Sovereign, Rocket steals some of their batteries, leading the Sovereign fleet to chase and attack the Guardians' ship. They crash land on a planet, where Quill meet his father, revealed to be Ego, a primordial Celestial who manifests a human avatar that allows him to interact with other races. Quill, Gamora, and Drax go with Ego to his planet while Rocket and Groot stay behind to watch Nebula and repair the ship. Ravagers arrive searching for Quill and, after a fight, capture Rocket and Groot and free Nebula. The Ravagers mutiny against their leader, Yondu, and aboard the Ravager ship, Rocket and Yondu plot their escape, eventually destroying most of the Ravager vessel except for a breakaway quarter, called the Quadrant, in which they travel to Ego. They learn that Ego is an evil living planet intent on dominating the universe. Quill keeps Ego occupied in combat with his newfound Celestial powers until Rocket is able to assemble a bomb, which the baby Groot places in Ego's brain. Later, Rocket and the rest of the Guardians hold a funeral for Yondu.

Sometime later, Rocket hears an explosion in the Quadrant and investigates, finding Groot. Rocket finds himself unable to stay mad when Groot gives Rocket an artistic drawing he made of the Guardians. Rocket is then almost sucked out of the ship before Groot saves him.

Infinity War

Four years later, Rocket and the Guardians respond to a distress signal and end up rescuing Thor, who is floating in space amidst the wreckage of the Statesman. Gamora tells them of the plan to obtain the Infinity Stones, and the Guardians split up, with Rocket and Groot accompanying Thor to Nidavellir to create a new weapon. On the way, Rocket gives Thor a replacement for an eye Thor has lost. They find an abandoned Nidavellir and meet the dwarf king Eitri. The four work together to create Stormbreaker, a powerful axe that also grants Thor the power of the Bifröst. Thor transports himself, Rocket, and Groot to Wakanda on Earth via the Bifröst to help members of the Avengers, Bucky Barnes, and the Wakandan army in the battle against the Outriders. During the battle, Rocket asks Barnes if he can have his arm, but vows to get it. Later, Rocket watches helplessly as Groot weakly calls out "I am Groot" one final time as he disappears in the Blip. Director James Gunn revealed that this phrase translated to "...Dad?" as Groot looked to Rocket for help.

Member of the Avengers

Rocket, along with Steve Rogers, Natasha Romanoff, Bruce Banner, James Rhodes and Thor, depart on the Quinjet and arrive at the Avengers Compound. Shortly after, they are met by Carol Danvers. Three weeks later, they witness Danvers bringing Tony Stark and Nebula back on the Benatar, and Rocket realizes that only he and Nebula were the remaining Guardians. After detecting another energy surge, Thor, Rogers, Romanoff, Rhodes, Banner, Danvers, and Nebula go into space to the Garden planet where they confront Thanos about the Stones. However, Rocket finds that the Gauntlet is empty, in which Thanos reveals he destroyed the Stones, causing Thor to abruptly kill him. With nothing left to do, they return to Earth.

Rocket then becomes a member of the Avengers and works on missions in space with Nebula, under Rogers' and Romanoff's leadership. In 2023, when a means is discovered to use quantum time travel to reverse the Blip, Rocket and Nebula return to the Compound. Rocket then accompanies Banner to New Asgard to convince a depressed Thor to return to help with the effort, while also meeting Valkyrie, Korg, and Miek. Rocket, Banner and Thor return to the Compound and Rocket aids Stark in building a quantum tunnel in the Compound's hangar. Afterwards, Rocket participates in the Time Heist brainstorming. When they are ready to go, he suits up in the Avengers Quantum suit, listens to Rogers' speech, and gives his spaceship to Clint Barton. Using the quantum tunnel, Rocket and Thor travel through the Quantum Realm to an alternate 2013 timeline and go to Asgard to get the Reality Stone, during the time when it had been absorbed into Jane Foster. They retrieve the Stone and return to the Compound in the main timeline, but after Banner uses the new Infinity Gauntlet to undo the Blip, an alternate Thanos attacks, trapping Rocket, Rhodes, and Banner underneath the destroyed Compound. Scott Lang, in his Giant-Man form, saves them, and Rocket joins the battle against alternate Thanos' army, where he is reunited with Groot. A week later, Rocket and the reunited Guardians of the Galaxy attend Stark's funeral at Stark's house. They then return to New Asgard to pick Thor up and depart for space.

Guardians Reassembled

Rocket, Thor, and the rest of the Guardians return to space and embark on several adventures, while reuniting with Kraglin, who joins the team. In 2024, after arriving on Indigarr, they are joined by Korg and fight off an invading army. Afterwards, they learn of several distress calls caused by a god killer and split up from Thor, as he sets off to locate Sif.

In 2025, the Guardians buy Knowhere from the Collector, and Rocket befriends Cosmo the Spacedog who joins their team. Rocket and the Guardians then work on rebuilding Knowhere following its attack. Later that year, Rocket participates in the Christmas celebration and is given Barnes' arm by Nebula as a gift.

Alternate versions

An alternate version of Rocket appears in the animated series What If...? as a non-speaking character.

Thor's party 

In an alternate 2011, Rocket participates in Thor's intergalactic party on Earth in Las Vegas.

Reception

See also 
 Characters of the Marvel Cinematic Universe

Notes

References

External links 
 Rocket on the Marvel Cinematic Universe Wiki
 
 Rocket on Marvel.com

Animal superheroes
Animated characters in film
Anthropomorphic mammals
Avengers (film series)
Fictional aerospace engineers
Fictional genocide survivors
Fictional gunfighters in films
Fictional inventors
Fictional marksmen and snipers
Fictional mercenaries
Fictional outlaws
Fictional prison escapees
Fictional raccoons
Fictional space pilots
Fictional thieves
Film characters introduced in 2014
Guardians of the Galaxy (film series)
Guardians of the Galaxy characters
Male characters in film
Marvel Cinematic Universe characters
Marvel Comics animals
Marvel Comics extraterrestrial superheroes
Marvel Comics male superheroes
Space pirates
Talking animals in fiction